TOCA Race Driver 2 (DTM Race Driver 2 in Germany and V8 Supercars Australia 2 in Australia) is a racing video game developed and published by Codemasters for Xbox, Microsoft Windows, PlayStation 2, Mobile and PlayStation Portable. It is the fifth game in the TOCA series.

Gameplay
The career mode offers a wider selection of championships than previous games, featuring the likes of Supertruck and Rallycross in addition to the traditional touring car formats. However, not for the first time in the series, the British Touring Car Championship was not included, yet the franchise continued to license the TOCA name in the title. In addition, online play was featured heavily, with support for up to 8 players on Xbox Live.

The PC version of the game features 31 licensed and fictional global race locations offering 48 tracks. These include Hockenheimring from the German DTM series and Surfers Paradise from the Australian V8 Supercars series. The PS2 version features an additional track, Catalunya. The PlayStation 2 version also allows up to 8 PS2 on-line players, without broadband Internet service being required, too.

Two PSP conversions were released in 2005 and 2006; the first being TOCA Race Driver 2 in Europe and Japan and the second being Race Driver 2006 in the US. The game continued to use a scripted career mode as introduced in the previous Race Driver game, but dropped the Ryan McKane character. Story-developing cutscenes were played out from a first-person perspective, with other characters never addressing the user by name (similar to the storytelling method of later Need for Speed titles). The Mobile phone version was released only in the U.S. a few months later.

Reception

The game received "generally favourable reviews" on all platforms except the Australian Xbox version, which received "universal acclaim", according to video game review aggregator Metacritic. In Japan, Famitsu gave it a score of two eights, one seven and one eight for the PSP version, and two eights and two sevens for the PlayStation 2 version.

TOCA Race Driver 2 received a runner-up position in GameSpot's 2004 "Best Driving Game" award category across all platforms, losing to Burnout 3: Takedown.

See also
 Race Driver 2006
 V8 Supercars in video games

References

External links
 
 Lotus Cup UK Driver
 Lotus Cup Championship

2004 video games
Codemasters games
Multiplayer and single-player video games
PlayStation 2 games
PlayStation Portable games
Racing video games
Split-screen multiplayer games
TOCA (series)
Supercars Championship
Video games set in Australia
Video games set in Austria
Video games set in England
Video games set in Germany
Video games set in Italy
Video games set in the Netherlands
Video games set in New Zealand
Video games set in Scotland
Video games set in South Africa
Video games set in Spain
Video games set in Sweden
Video games set in the United States
Windows games
Xbox games
Video games developed in the United Kingdom
Sumo Digital games